Pyotr Mikhaylovich Latyshev (30 August 1948 – 2 December 2008) was the Presidential Envoy to Urals Federal District, Russia.

Latyshev was born in 1948 in Proskurov (now Khmelnitskiy), Ukrainian Soviet Socialist Republic. He attended the Omsk Higher Police School of the Soviet Ministry of Internal Affairs in 1970 and the Omsk Academy of the Ministry of Internal Affairs in 1980.

In 1980, Latyshev began his police career as an inspector for the Department Against Misappropriation of Socialist Property (OBKhSS) a section of the interior ministry's regional directorate for Perm. He also served as an assistant department head, department head, and head of the OBKhSS Directorate of the ministry's regional directorate for Perm.

From 1991–1994, Latyshev was the head of the Interior Ministry's regional directorate for Krasnodar Krai.  He was Deputy Minister of the Interior and simultaneously vice-chairman of the Federal Anti-Terrorism Commission from August 1994 to May 2000.  Latyshev carried out security operations in Dagestan in 1999 and was highly successful at defusing ethnic tensions in Karachay–Cherkessia.

The main responsibility of a presidential envoy to any of the seven regions is the ensurance of presidential authority in that region. Loyalty and knowledge of the region are therefore the most highly valued traits in a prospective envoy.

Latyshev died suddenly on December 2, 2008 due to heart failure.

Honours and awards
 Order of Merit for the Fatherland;
3rd class (30 August 2008) - for outstanding contribution to strengthening Russian statehood and many years of diligent work
4th class
 Order of Honour (17 April 1998) - for services in the development of physical culture and sports, many years of fruitful work at the All-fiekulturno sports society "Dynamo"
 Order of St. Sergius, 1st class (Russian Orthodox Church, 2003)

References

1948 births
2008 deaths
Politicians from Perm, Russia
1st class Active State Councillors of the Russian Federation
Politicians from Khmelnytskyi, Ukraine
Burials in Troyekurovskoye Cemetery
Recipients of the Order "For Merit to the Fatherland", 3rd class
Recipients of the Order of Honour (Russia)